Addinall is an English surname. Notable people with the surname include:

 Bert Addinall (1921–2005), English football player
 Percy Addinall (born 1888), English football player
 Shaun Addinall (born 1969), South African lawn bowler

References 

Surnames of English origin